Antonio Zoppi (1860–1926) was an Italian painter, mostly of genre and costume scenes, as well as landscapes.

He was born and resident in Novara. In 1881 at Milan he exhibited: Paggio del secolo XVI. In 1881 at Rome he exhibited: Fate la carità e In vino laetitia. To other exhibitions he sent: Winter Sun; Dolci ricordi; Il nonno; Adele; Study of a head; A landscaper of Tobacco; and Savoy and Winter Morning. Vendemmia was exhibited at the Brera Academy in 1822. Another painter by the same name was born in Piacenza on April 8, 1826. He was a decorative painter and one depicting quadratura.

Among his works: a quadratura painting inside the house of Dezzopis; a garden in the house of signor Filippo Guastoni at Piacenza, and another depicting a garden in casa Beltrami, the Sanvitali depicting the sea. He painted also scenography and decorations for the Teatro Municipale.

References

1860 births
1926 deaths
19th-century Italian painters
Italian male painters
20th-century Italian painters
20th-century Italian male artists
Painters from Piedmont
Italian landscape painters
Italian genre painters
Italian costume genre painters
19th-century Italian male artists
People from Novara